The Jeremiah Dexter House is a historic colonial house in Providence, Rhode Island.  It is a -story gambrel-roofed wood-frame structure, built in 1754 for printer Jeremiah Dexter on farm land that was originally granted to his ancestor Gregory Dexter, a friend and printer for Roger Williams.  It is five bays wide, with a large central chimney typical of the period, and is one of the few surviving colonial-era farmhouses in the city.  The Dexter farm is further notable as the site where French Army troops were stationed upon their return from Virginia in 1782, during the American Revolutionary War.  The paved parking lot which surrounds the house on two sides is believed to contain archaeological remains of the French camp.

The house was added to the National Register of Historic Places in 1976.

See also

National Register of Historic Places in Providence, Rhode Island

References

External links

Houses completed in 1754
Houses on the National Register of Historic Places in Rhode Island
Houses in Providence, Rhode Island
Historic American Buildings Survey in Rhode Island
1754 establishments in Rhode Island
National Register of Historic Places in Providence, Rhode Island